Léger Djimrangar (born 2 October 1987) is a Chadian football midfielder who plays for AS CotonTchad and the Chad national football team.

Career 

He played for Egyptian club Al Nasr, where he came from FC Tourbillon N'Djamena. He won Chadian Cup and Super Cup in 2008. From 2012 to 2015 he was the member of Difaa El Jadida from Morocco. He moved to Foullah Edifice in 2014. After two seasons in Missile FC in Gabon, he moved to Elect-Sport in 2018.

International career 

Djimrangar is a member of Chad national football team, where he plays on left wing position. He has 28 caps for national team and seven goals, and was a part of qualifying campaign for 2010 World Cup, 2012 Africa Cup of Nations, 2013 Africa Cup of Nations and 2017 Africa Cup of Nations. He also scored three unofficial goals for the national team.

International goals

See also
 List of Chad international footballers

References

1987 births
Living people
People from N'Djamena
Chadian footballers
Chad international footballers
Tourbillon FC players
Al Nasr SC (Egypt) players
Difaâ Hassani El Jadidi players
Foullah Edifice FC players
Missile FC players
Elect-Sport FC players
AS CotonTchad players
Association football midfielders
Chadian expatriate footballers
Expatriate footballers in Egypt
Chadian expatriate sportspeople in Egypt
Expatriate footballers in Morocco
Chadian expatriate sportspeople in Morocco
Expatriate footballers in Gabon
Chadian expatriate sportspeople in Gabon